Mabel Addis Mergardt (21 May 1912 – 13 August 2004) was an American writer, teacher and the first female video game designer. She designed The Sumerian Game, programmed by William McKay, for the IBM 7090 in 1964. It inspired similarly-styled kingdom management games such as Hamurabi from the early 1970s.

Early life and education
James Holmes and Mabel Wood gave birth to Mabel Holmes on 21 May 1912. Mabel grew up in Mount Vernon. She excelled in school, graduating valedictorian from Brewster High School in 1929. After graduating, she attended Barnard College. At Barnard, she obtained a degree in ancient history and a minor in psychology by 1933. She attended Columbia University for her graduate schooling, and obtained a masters degree in education.

Career
Upon obtaining her master’s degree in education, Addis worked in a rural one-room school. In 1937, she moved to the Hyatt Avenue School. At this time, Mabel married Alexander L. Addis in 1942, officially becoming Mabel Addis. She worked there for thirteen years before finally moving to Katonah-Lewisboro School District in 1950. She taught in this district until 1976.

Select publications 
Addis was very active in her community during this period of time. She used her knowledge of history to contribute to both history and book committees in the school district. She wrote and published historical articles, started an oral history collection, and co-authored a book titled Katonah: a History of a New York Village and Brewster Through the Years. However, her most notable work occurred in the 1960s. Addis was elected to work with IBM and Boards of Cooperative Educational Services to create the first text-based computer game. The game was titled The Sumerian Game. It allowed the players to act as rulers of the Sumerian city of Lagash. This was effectively the first ever video game established on a fully electronic computer. Subsequently, this made Addis the first writer for computer video games, as well as the first person to design a video game. 

Also see https://www.gamesradar.com/remembering-mabel-addis-the-first-video-game-writer-on-international-womens-day/. " The Sumerian Game gave us was centered around narrative; not something you’d expect to be high up the list of priorities in a rather dry genre. This came through some unexpected events which moved the experience on from a simple mathematics equations into more of a story; store too much grain and rats may invade your stores, for example. All of the reports were fed to you by a steward, who had a meek, deferential Smithers style personality; his appearance a refreshing break from a cold computer AI regurgitating numbers on your screen. "

Personal life and legacy 
Addis’ husband died in 1981, leaving her widowed. She remarried in 1991 to Gerard Mergardt. Mergardt died in 1995, leaving Addis widowed once more. Addis passed away in 2004. She was posthumously awarded the Pioneer Award during the 2023 edition of Game Developers Conference on 23 February 2023.

References 

1912 births
2004 deaths
American women non-fiction writers
20th-century American women writers
American video game designers
Women video game designers
21st-century American women
Electronic literature writers